The Taylor Square Firehouse is an historic fire station at 113 Garden Street in Cambridge, Massachusetts.  The stylistically eclectic brick building was built in 1904 to a design by local architect Charles Greco.  Although it has a somewhat standard building plan dictated by its function, the building has exotic architectural details, including a projecting cornice with large wooden brackets, patterned brickwork on the parapet, and Moorish Revival decoration of the truck bay arches.  It is the most elaborate of the fire stations built by the city in that period.

The building was listed on the National Register of Historic Places in 1982.

See also
National Register of Historic Places listings in Cambridge, Massachusetts

References

Fire stations completed in 1904
Fire stations on the National Register of Historic Places in Massachusetts
Buildings and structures in Cambridge, Massachusetts
National Register of Historic Places in Cambridge, Massachusetts